The Banqiao 435 Art Zone is an art center in Banqiao District, New Taipei, Taiwan.

History
The area used to be old housing areas for veterans training. In 2012, the Cultural Affairs Department of New Taipei City Government assumed responsibility for the building which was once used as the job training center by the central government from Banqiao District Office.

Architecture
The building features a neoclassic architectural style with large open space. At the entrance lies the Zhongzheng Memorial Hall, with facade constructed by the towering and symmetrical Doric columns and carved mountain walls. It also features some indoor spaces used as studios for emerging artists. It spans over an area of 5 hectares.

Activities
The center regularly holds exhibitions, art classes and educational activities. It also collaborate with other organizations and schools for street performances and various exhibitions and events.

Transportation
The center is accessible within walking distance south of Xinzhuang Station of Taipei Metro.

See also
 List of tourist attractions in Taiwan

References

External links

 

Art centers in New Taipei
Banqiao District